The Americas Zone was one of the four zones within Group 3 of the regional Davis Cup competition in 2014. The zone's competition was held in round robin format in Humacao, Puerto Rico, in June 2014. The nine competing nations were divided into one pool of four and one of five. The winners and runners up from each pool played off to determine the two nations to be promoted to Americas Zone Group II in 2015, while the third and fourth placed nations played to off to determine overall placings within the group.

Participating nations

Draw

The nine teams were divided into one pool of four and one of five. The winner of each pool plays off against the runner-up of the other pool, and the two winners of these play-offs are promoted to Americas Zone Group II in 2015. The third and fourth placed teams in each pool play off against the equivalent team from the other pool to determine overall rankings within the group. The fifth placed team in Pool B does not enter the play-offs.

The group was staged from 2 to 7 June 2015 at the Palmas Athletic Club in Humacao, Puerto Rico.

Pool A

Pool B

First round

Pool A

Bahamas vs. Cuba

Honduras vs. Panama

Bahamas vs. Panama

Honduras vs. Cuba

Bahamas vs. Honduras

Panama vs. Cuba

Pool B

Puerto Rico vs. Bermuda

Costa Rica vs. Trinidad and Tobago

Puerto Rico vs. Jamaica

Trinidad and Tobago vs. Bermuda

Costa Rica vs. Bermuda

Jamaica vs. Trinidad and Tobago

Puerto Rico vs. Trinidad and Tobago

Costa Rica vs. Jamaica

Jamaica vs. Bermuda

Puerto Rico vs. Costa Rica

Play-offs

Promotion

Cuba vs. Costa Rica

Puerto Rico vs. Bahamas

5th place play-off: Honduras vs. Bermuda

7th place play-off: Panama vs. Jamaica

Outcomes

References

2014 Davis Cup Americas Zone
Davis Cup Americas Zone